Natarajan Krishnan (6 October 1938  15 September 2020) was an Indian diplomat and negotiator who served as the 5th permanent representative of India to the United Nations from 1967 to 71 and the president of the United Nations Security Council in 1985.

He also headed the Africa Fund as the prime minister's special envoy and also served as dean at Pondicherry University for the department of international studies.

Biography 
Prior to joining the Indian Foreign Service on 17 July 1951, he obtained a degree in economics. He also qualified Union Public Service Commission interview and subsequently topped 1951 batch of civil services.

Role in Iran–Iraq War 
When the war between Iran and Iraq broke out, the two countries failed to reach to peace deal. Krishnan formulated a peace deal and conducted negotiations, and the two countries agreed to that formulation on October 1984.

References 

1938 births
2020 deaths
Permanent Representatives of India to the United Nations
Academic staff of Pondicherry University
Place of birth missing